South Point High School may refer to

 South Point High School (India) in Kolkata
 South Point High School (North Carolina) in Belmont, North Carolina
 South Point High School (Ohio) in South Point, Ohio

See also
South Pointe High School (disambiguation)